Aquimarina spongiicola is a Gram-negative, aerobic, non-spore-forming, rod-shaped and motile bacterium from the genus of Aquimarina which has been isolated from spongin.

References 

Flavobacteria
Bacteria described in 2018